Sri Vikrama Rajasinha (Sinhala:ශ්‍රී වික්‍රම රාජසිංහ, Tamil:ஸ்ரீ விக்கிரம ராஜசிங்க; 1780 – January 30, 1832, born Kannasamy Nayaka) was the last of four Kings to rule the last Sinhalese monarchy of the Kingdom of Kandy in Sri Lanka. The Nayak Kings were of Telugu origin and practiced Shaivite Hinduism and were patrons of Theravada Buddhism. The Nayak rulers played a huge role in reviving Buddhism in the island. They spoke Telugu and Tamil, and used Tamil as the court language in Kandy alongside Sinhala.

The King was eventually deposed by the British government under the terms of the Kandyan Convention in 1815, ending over 2,300 years of domination by the Sinhalese crown on the island. The island was incorporated into the British Empire, and Sri Vikrama Rajasinha was succeeded by George III, as monarch of British Ceylon.

Early life 

Prior to his coronation in 1798, Sri Vikrama Rajasinha was known as Prince Kannasamy Naidu. He was a member of the Madurai Nayak Dynasty and the nephew of Sri Rajadhi Rajasinha. He succeeded his uncle as the King of Kandy in 1798 at the age of eighteen.

Reign

Early reign 

There was a rival claimant to succeed Sri Rajadhi Rajasinha, the brother of Queen Upendrama, who had a stronger claim. However, Pilimatalauwa, the first Adigar (prime minister), chose Prince Kannasamy, reportedly with deep-seated plans to usurp the throne to set up a dynasty of his own. Sri Vikrama Rajasinha was faced with numerous conspiracies to overthrow him and reigned through one of the most turbulent periods in Sri Lanka's history.

Internal conflict 

During his time, the British who had succeeded the Dutch in the Maritime Provinces had not interfered in the politics of the Kingdom of Kandy. But Pilimatalauwa, the first Adigar of the King, desiring British control over the island, covertly worked with the British administration to provoke the King to acting aggressively towards them in order to give Britain a casus belli against the Kandyian Kingdom. The Adigar manipulated the King into starting a military conflict with the British, who had gained a strong position in the coastal provinces. War was declared and on March 22, 1803, the British entered Kandy with no resistance, Sri Vikrama Rajasinha having fled. The Adigar massacred the British garrison in Kandy in June and restored the King to the throne. Pilimitalava plotted to overthrow the King and seize the crown for himself, but his plot was discovered, and, having been pardoned on two previous occasions, he was executed.

The disgraced Adigar was replaced by his nephew, Ehelepola Nilame, who soon came under suspicion of following his uncle in plotting the overthrow of Sri Vikrama Rajasinha. A rebellion instigated by Ehalepola was suppressed, after which he then fled to Colombo and joined the British. After failing to surrender (after 3 weeks of notice), the exasperated King dismissed Ehelepola, confiscated his lands, and ordered the imprisonment and execution of his wife and children. A propagandised account of the execution was widely circulated by sympathisers.

Ehelepola fled to British-controlled territory, where he persuaded the British that Sri Vikrama Rajasinha's tyranny deserved a military intervention. The pretext was provided by the seizure of a number of British merchants, who were detained on suspicion of spying and were tortured, killing several of them. An invasion was duly mounted and advanced to Kandy without resistance, reaching the city on February 10, 1815. On March 2, the Kingdom was ceded to the British under a treaty called the Kandyan Convention.

Regarding the King's reign, the historian Louis Edmund Blaze states that "He was not as ardent a patriot as his immediate successors; nor did he show those mental and moral qualities which enabled former Kings to hold their own against rebellion and invasion. To say he was cruel does not mean much, for cruel Kings and nobles were not rare in those days; and it is questionable whether all the cruel deeds attributed to Sri Vickrama Rajasinha were of his own devising or done by his authority. It might be more fair to regard him as a weak tool in the hands of designing chiefs than as the monster of cruelty, which it is an idle fashion with some writers to call him. He did a lot to beautify his capital. The lake and the Octagon in Kandy have always been considered the work of the King."

Death 

On March 2, 1815, the Kingdom was ceded to Britain and Sri Vikrama Rajasinha was deposed and taken as a royal prisoner by the British to Vellore Fort in southern India. He lived on a small allowance given to him with his two queens by the British colonial administration. He died of dropsy on January 30, 1832, aged 52 years.

His death anniversary has been commemorated as Guru Pooja by descendants at Muthu Mandabam, Vellore, Tamil Nadu, India, since 2011.

Family 
Parents

 Lord Venakatha Perumal – father
 Lady Subbramma Nayakkar – mother

Siblings

 Prince Sri Perumal – brother
 Prince Dawala Kumara Sami – brother 

Consorts

 Queen Consort Sri Venakatha Rangammal Devi – Spouse 1
 Royal Concubine Venakatha Jammal Devi – spouse 2
 Royal Concubine Venakatha Ammal Devi – spouse 3
 Royal Concubine Muttu Kannammal – spouse 4
 Royal Concubine Pilimathalawe Devi – spouse 5
 Raani Thayarammal Devi – according to some legends.
 Raani Sitammal Devi – according to some legends.

Children

 Prince Rajadhi Rajasinghe (son) + Princess Consort Savithri Devi (daughter-in-law)
 Princess Rajaratne Kamsalya Devi (daughter)
 Princess Sri Raja Nachchiyar Devi (daughter) + Lord Alagiri Sami (son-in-law)
 Princess Sinhala Gauri Devi (daughter)
 Princess Raja Lakshmi Devi (daughter) + Lord Ranga Raja (son-in-law)

Grandchildren

 Prince Sri Dharmaraja (grand son), son of Princess Sri Raja Nachchiyar Devi. + Lady Muttu Krishnal Ammal Devi (grand daughter-in-law)
 Princess Chaya Devi (grand daughter), daughter of Princess Raja Nachchiyar Devi.
 Prince Tyaga Raja (grand son), son of Princess Sri Raja Nachchiyar Devi.
 Prince Sri Alagia Manawala Sinhala Raja (grand son), son of Princess Raja Lakshmi Devi.

Great-grandchildren

 Prince Sri Vikrama Raja (great-grandson), son of Prince Sri Alagia Manawala Sinhala Raja. + Lady Snagavalli Tyagar Ammal (great-granddaughter-in-law)

Great-great-grandchildren

 Two children of Prince Sri Vikrama Raja.

Legacy 

The current Flag of Sri Lanka incorporates Sri Vikrama Rajasinha's Royal Standard. In September 1945 it was proposed in an address to the State Council that the flag be adopted as Sri Lanka's national flag:
"This House is of opinion that the Royal Standard of King Sri Vikrama Rajasinha depicting a yellow lion passant holding a sword in its right paw on a red background, which was removed to England after the Convention of 1815, should once again be adopted as the official flag of Free Lanka."

Kandy Lake, an artificial lake overlooking the palace in Kandy, was commissioned by Sri Vikrama Rajasinha.

The Paththirippuwa or Octagon of the Sri Dalada Maligawa, is widely regarded as the epitome or the most admired symbol and representation of Kandyan Sinhalese Architecture. It was built in 1802 A.D. by Devendra Mulachari, Master Craftsman and Royal Architect, on the instructions of King Sri Vikrama Rajasinha.

During Sri Vikrama Rajasinha's time as a royal prisoner in Vellore Fort he received a privy purse, which his descendants continued to receive from the Government of Ceylon until 1965. Muthu Mandapam is a memorial built around the tombstone of Sri Vikrama Rajasinha, the last south Indian origin ruler of Kandy. Situated on the bank Palar River, it is just one km north of Vellore town.

During Sri Vikrama Rajasinha's reign, Tamil was used as one of the court languages in Kandy – a historical fact with implications for the present-day politics of Sri Lanka.

In 2018, a Sinhala film titled Girivassipura was made and released which depicts the real-life story of the King Sri Vikrama Rajasinha.

See also 

 List of Sri Lankan monarchs
 Madurai Nayak Dynasty
 Kandyan Wars

References 

 Kings & Rulers of Sri Lanka
 The Last King
 Robert Binning, A Journal of Two Years' Travel in Persia, Ceylon, etc. Volume 1. (Wm. H. Allen & Co., 1857)
 Horace Hayman Wilson, The history of British India, from 1805 to 1835. (James Madden, 1858)
 The Last King of Kandy
 Capture of the Last King of Kandy
 British invasion on Kandy
 The 1815 Kandyan Convention at the Audience Hall
 Ananda Senarath Pilimatalavuva, The Pilimatalavuvas in the last days of the Kandyan kingdom (Sinhalé), Stamford Lake Publication, 2008..
 Oil Painting on ceremonial opening of the Paththiruppuwa by the last King Sri Wickrema Rajasinghe in 1802,  handed over to the Sri Dalada Maligawa

External links 

 Last days of Sri Wickrama Rajasingha
 ඇහැලේපොල වර්ණනාව

S
1780 births
1832 deaths
Dethroned monarchs
Deaths from edema
Vikrama
Vikrama
S
S